Chattanooga Metropolitan Airport  (Lovell Field) is 5 miles (8 km) east of downtown Chattanooga, in Hamilton County, Tennessee, United States. The airport is owned and operated by the Chattanooga Metropolitan Airport Authority. It is a Class C airport serviced by the Chattanooga Airport Traffic Control Tower. The Federal Aviation Administration (FAA) National Plan of Integrated Airport Systems for 2019–2023 categorized it as a small-hub primary commercial service facility.

History
The first scheduled airline flight in Tennessee took place in Chattanooga in 1928 at Marr Field, dedicated in December 1919, named for Walter L. Marr, off present-day Amnicola Highway. Chattanooga was a stopover on the Contract Air Mail route served by Interstate Airlines between Atlanta and Chicago. Charles Lindbergh, the world-famous aviator who had piloted the Spirit of St. Louis over the Atlantic Ocean in May 1927, flew into Marr Field on October 5, 1927.

In 1930, due to the interest and foresight of John Lovell, a new Chattanooga Airport opened with an unpaved runway at its present location and was named Lovell Field in his honor. In 1936, the landing area was expanded and runways paved as a part of the New Deal's Works Progress Administration (WPA). The original terminal building was built at that time.

During World War II, Lovell Field was a military training facility. Growth in aviation in the 1950s led to a transfer of airport operations to the City of Chattanooga and airport expansion with a new runway, the primary runway today. The original terminal building, dating from the 1930s, was expanded in 1950 and 1955 by the city before being replaced by a new terminal in 1964.

The airport's ownership was transferred from Chattanooga to the Chattanooga Metropolitan Airport Authority (CMAA) in July 1985.

The current passenger terminal, designed by Gensler, opened in 1992.

In 2011, a 1 megawatt solar farm located on the southwest corner of the airfield was constructed. An additional 1.1 megawatts were added to the solar farm in the summer of 2013.  By 2017, the farm was providing approximately 90% of the airport's electricity.

Chattanooga Metropolitan Airport was home to the 241st Engineering Installation Squadron (241 EIS) of the Tennessee Air National Guard until late 2010, when the squadron moved to a Bonny Oaks facility near the airport.

Facilities

Runways

Terminal
Chattanooga Metropolitan Airport has one concourse with five gates as of January 2023 but is being expanded. Airline service is provided by United Express, Delta Air Lines, American Eagle, and Allegiant Air. The largest aircraft currently serving the airport are the Airbus A319/A320 (operated by Allegiant Air and Delta Air Lines) and even the Boeing 757 (operated by FedEx Express). The McDonnell-Douglas MD-80 series aircraft used to be one of the larger aircraft that serviced CHA, but these were retired early because of the COVID-19 pandemic. Delta had flown a mainline service from 1947 until withdrawing in 1995 after 48 years in favor of affiliates like Atlantic Southeast Airlines operating smaller regional jets, such as the CRJ-200. Delta subsequently decided to resume its mainline service flights, including DC-9s, to Chattanooga in September 2012.

In the 2020-2021 time-frame, a multi-story car park was built. In addition, despite the COVID-19 pandemic the number of gates is being expanded to seven as part of the expansion plans due to record numbers of passengers using the airport pre-COVID.

Other
General aviation is serviced by Wilson Air Center FBO. The general aviation ramp is in two locations, one on the south side of the main terminal and the other on the north. The locations are referred to as "Air North" and "Air South." General aviation can find service at either location. In August 2011, Wilson Air Center opened a facility on the west side of the field.

Airlines and destinations

Passenger

Cargo

Statistics

Top destinations

Airline market share

Accidents and incidents
On November 11, 1972, Southern Airways Flight 49, a hijacked McDonnell Douglas DC-9 with 31 passengers and 3 crew members aboard, landed at Lovell Field from Knoxville's McGhee Tyson Airport to pick up $10 million that the three hijackers had demanded. After picking up the ransom money, which actually amounted to between $2 million and $2.5 million, the plane took off, bound for Havana, Cuba.
On November 27, 1973, Delta Air Lines Flight 516, a McDonnell Douglas DC-9, crashed short of the runway in severe weather on approach to the airport from Atlanta's William B. Hartsfield Atlanta International Airport. The airliner burst into flames that were quickly extinguished in part by torrential rains and deep standing water where the aircraft ended up. 38 passengers and 4 crew were injured in the incident and the aircraft was damaged beyond repair.

References

External links

 
 History of Airline Service at Chattanooga
 Lovell Field  page at Tennessee DOT Airport Directory
 

Airports in Tennessee
Economy of Chattanooga, Tennessee
Transportation in Chattanooga, Tennessee
Buildings and structures in Chattanooga, Tennessee
Airports established in 1930
1930 establishments in Tennessee